Ekaterina Alexeyevna Ryabova (born 27 March 2003) is a  retired Russian-Azerbaijani figure skater who represented Azerbaijan in women's singles. She is the 2021 CS Denis Ten Memorial Challenge silver medalist, the 2019 CS Ice Star bronze medalist, the 2018 Ice Star champion, the 2019 Volvo Open Cup silver medalist, and the 2019 Azerbaijani national champion.

Ryabova placed eighth at the 2020 Winter Youth Olympics. She is currently the 13th highest-ranked ladies figure skater in the world by the International Skating Union.

Personal life 
Ryabova was born on 27 March 2003 in Moscow, Russia. , she is a high school student. Her younger sister Anna is also a skater. Ryabova became engaged to French ice dancer Geoffrey Brissaud on 23 April 2022.

Career

Early years 
Ryabova began learning to skate in 2006 as a three-year-old. As a child, she trained under her father, Alexei Ryabov, at the Dynamo Moscow sports club. In 2015, she moved to Sambo 70 to be coached by Sergei Davydov. She changed coaches after a year, joining Alexander Volkov and Evgeni Plushenko at the Angels of Plushenko rink.

Ryabova made no junior international appearances for Russia.

2018–2019 season 
Ryabova made her international debut for Azerbaijan in September 2018 at the ISU Junior Grand Prix (JGP) in Kaunas, Lithuania. She finished sixth overall after placing seventh in both segments. She had the same final result at her second assignment, 2018 JGP Slovenia. 

Making her senior international debut, Ryabova won gold in October at the 2018 Minsk Arena Ice Star, outscoring the silver medalist, France's Léa Serna, by about nine points. She placed eighth at the 2018 CS Tallinn Trophy and sixth at the 2018 CS Golden Spin of Zagreb. 

In January 2019, Ryabova was named to Azerbaijan's team for the 2019 European Championships in Minsk, Belarus. Ranked seventh in the short program, she qualified to the free skate. She placed thirteenth in the free skate and finished twelfth overall.

In March 2019, at the 2019 World Championships, Ryabova placed seventeenth in the short program and qualified to the free skate. She placed thirteenth in the free skate and thirteenth overall.

2019–2020 season 

Ryabova opened her first full senior season in September 2019 at the 2019 CS Ondrej Nepela Memorial, where she placed fifth overall.  She was fifth as well at the Denis Ten Memorial Challenge before winning the bronze medal at the 2019 CS Ice Star and silver at the Volvo Open Cup.  Making her Grand Prix debut at the 2019 Rostelecom Cup, she placed fifth there.

Competing as a junior, Ryabova placed eighth at the 2020 Winter Youth Olympics in January 2020. She then finished sixth at the 2020 European Championships later in the month.

Ryabova finished the season with a tenth-place finish at the 2020 World Junior Championships. She was also assigned to compete at the 2020 World Championships, but these were cancelled due to the COVID-19 pandemic.

2020–2021 season 
With the pandemic continuing to limit international events, Ryabova competed at the 2020 Rostelecom Cup, placing ninth. In December, she left coaches Evgeni Plushenko and Alexander Volkov, citing being "no longer satisfied with the training conditions." She returned to her previous coaches, her parents, Alexei Ryabov and Ekaterina Bandurina.

Ryabova competed at the 2021 World Championships in Stockholm, placing twelfth to qualify for a berth for Azerbaijan at the 2022 Winter Olympics.

2021–2022 season 
Ryabova began the Olympic season at the 2021 Budapest Trophy, where she placed fourth, before winning the silver medal at the 2021 Denis Ten Memorial Challenge. On the Grand Prix, Ryabova finished in seventh place at her first event, the 2021 Internationaux de France. She went on to place tenth at the 2021 Rostelecom Cup. Ryabova closed out the year by winning the Santa Claus Cup.

At the 2022 European Championships, Ryabova finished in sixth place. Competing in the women's event at the 2022 Winter Olympics, Ryabova was sixteenth in the short program. Fifteenth in the free skate, she rose to fifteenth overall.

Days after the Olympics concluded, Vladimir Putin ordered an invasion of Ukraine, as a result of which the International Skating Union banned all Russian and Belarusian skaters from competing at the 2022 World Championships. However, Ryabova was still allowed to compete since she represented Azerbaijan. Ryabova placed ninth in the short program. Eleventh in the free skate, she remained ninth overall.

Retirement 
Ryabova announced her retirement from competitive figure skating on Instagram on 6 September 2022.

Programs

Competitive highlights 

 GP: Grand Prix; CS: Challenger Series; JGP: Junior Grand Prix

For Azerbaijan

Detailed results 

Small medals for short and free programs awarded only at ISU Championships. Personal bests highlighted in bold.

References

External links 
 

2003 births
Living people
Azerbaijani female single skaters
Russian female single skaters
Figure skaters from Moscow
Figure skaters at the 2020 Winter Youth Olympics
Figure skaters at the 2022 Winter Olympics
Olympic figure skaters of Azerbaijan
Russian emigrants to Azerbaijan